Air is the debut album of the band Agua de Annique formed by the former The Gathering vocalist Anneke van Giersbergen. The album is a pop/rock oriented album and was released in 2007. Anneke van Giersbergen also plays piano on the album.

Track listing 
All tracks by Anneke van Giersbergen except where noted

"Beautiful One" – 4:43
"Witnesses" – 4:17
"Yalin" – 3:23
"Day After Yesterday" – 3:43
"My Girl" – 4:14
"Take Care of Me" – 2:43
"Ice Water" – 4:10
"You Are Nice!" – 3:16
"Trail of Grief" – 4:35
"Come Wander with Me" (Jeff Alexander) – 3:32
"Sunken Soldiers Ball"  – 5:07
"Lost And Found" (Kristin Fjelltseth) – 5:15
"Asleep" – 2:30
"Notthemostprettygirl" (Bonus Track) – 3:14

There is an animated video of the song "Day After Yesterday" which can be viewed on their official site. There is also a video for the cover song "Come Wander With Me," which was released as a download-single in 2008.

Personnel
Anneke van Giersbergen – vocals, piano
Joris Dirks – guitars, vocals
Jacques de Haard – bass
Rob Snijders – drums

External links 
 Official Site

2007 debut albums
Anneke van Giersbergen (band) albums